Barry Cahill may refer to:

 Barry Cahill (Gaelic footballer) (born 1981), Gaelic footballer for Dublin
 Barry Cahill (actor) (1921–2012), Canadian-born American actor